Edmund "Edy" Bruggmann (15 April 1943 – 9 June 2014) was a Swiss alpine skier. At the 1972 Winter Olympics, Bruggmann won the silver medal in Giant Slalom.

He died of leukaemia on 9 June 2014.

References

External links
 

1943 births
2014 deaths
Swiss male alpine skiers
Olympic alpine skiers of Switzerland
Olympic silver medalists for Switzerland
Alpine skiers at the 1964 Winter Olympics
Alpine skiers at the 1968 Winter Olympics
Alpine skiers at the 1972 Winter Olympics
Olympic medalists in alpine skiing
Sportspeople from the canton of St. Gallen
Medalists at the 1972 Winter Olympics
20th-century Swiss people